The 2009 Women's European Fistball Championship was held in Zofingen (Switzerland) from August 14 to 15, with five women's national teams: Austria, Catalonia, Germany, Italy and Switzerland.

The first round was played as the best of 3 sets (11 points) and the rest of competition was played as the best of 5 sets.

Switzerland were the champions.

Teams

First round

Qualification round

Final standings

External links
Official website (Retrieved 16-08-2009)
International Fistball Association

Fistball
European international sports competitions
Fistball